Dr. E.K.T Sivakumar (born 28 September 1968) is an Indian chemist born in a small hamlet of Tamil Nadu called Podaturpet near Tiruttani. He is a visiting professor in Anna University, Department of Ceramic Technology. He is also the editor of a Tamil journal Valarum Ariviyal.

Biography 
Dr. E.K.T Sivakumar was born to a Teacher Dr E K Thiruvengadam and EKT Vijaya. His father has also penned various book in religious awakening, historical and freedom fighters life books context. Dr. Sivakumar was honoured with the title "Best Teacher Award" from Government of Tamil Nadu, India. With previous experience in Centre for Nano Science and Technology and currently holding the post of Visiting Professor in Depart of Ceramic Technology, Anna University, Chennai, Dr.E.K.T.Sivakumar has not stopped with his passion for research and teaching. His mission is to establish scientific temper among people and spreading knowledge about science and technology for the betterment of the society. He regularly writes articles about science for youth and children. With over 500 awards in his name, he was bestowed with the 'Best Children's Science Writer Award 2015' by BAPASI in March 2015.  He is also the Founder and Editor of Valarum Ariviyal, a quarterly magazine in Tamil that propagates information and knowledge about Science and Technology to the general audience.  Dr. Sivakumar is a scientist, a Professor and a social activist too. He has devoted himself to the cause of students, the poor and the needy, the differently-abled and senior citizens through innumerable social activities on a continued basis.

Education 
Having his school background in rural Tamil Nadu, He completed his undergraduate study BSc chemistry from D G Vaishnav College, Chennai, and excelled in his studies. Subsequently, he pursued postgraduate studies from Gurunanak College and completed his master's degree in chemistry. He simultaneously completed his B.Ed. from Annamalai University in 1993. He also went forward to attain his PhD in chemistry in 2001 from Presidency college, University of Madras, Chennai, India.

Career 
After completing his education in 1991, his first employment was at Bush Boake Allen, Chennai, as quality control executive. While working, he simultaneously studied and completed his BEd in chemistry. Immediately after completing his B.Ed, he began his foray into research and development division of Amrutanjan Healthcare after his meeting with Mr Radhakrishnan, the then managing director of Amrutanjan. Dr E K T Sivakumar is presently visiting professor in Anna University – Department of Ceramic Technology and earlier at Centre for Nano science and Technology. He is the editor of Valarum Ariviyal magazine and to his credit he has Dr Mylswamy Annadurai, the famous Chandrayan expedition scientist in ISRO in the editorial board. He is also founder of ESR Foundation, Chennai and ESRO – Education and Social Research Organization. and associated with NESA, New Delhi. He has also authored more than 24 books and participated in various International seminars and presented papers on various scientific forays.

He has participated in various international seminars, workshops and science conferences and presented papers on a range of scientific topics. Some of the responsibilities that ESRO has taken up are facilitating scholarships to meritorious and needy students to pursue higher education, clean water and sanitation program, civil society program at poorest areas, initiation of research activities on environmental pollution and mitigate consequences of natural disaster. His 32 years of service for the society as a scientist, journalist and philanthropist were first documented in a Tamil book titled ‘Sigarathai Nooki EKT Sivakumar’. Subsequently, his accomplishments, life learnings and experiences with stalwarts like Dr. APJ Abdul Kalam and Dr. Mylswamy Annadurai were penned in an English book ‘Scientist on a Social Mission’ that was released in English 2018.

Books authored 

 Valarum Ariviyal
Elements of Chemical Spectroscopy
Radio Chemistry
Chemistry of Fuels
Madhuva? Madhiya?
Ariviyal Arputham
Boomiyai Kulirvippom
Ariviyalum Anmigamum
Sugam Tharum Sutrupuram
Sugam Tharum Sugatharam
 Pugaye Vazhvin Pagai
Thadaigalai Thandiya Thambi
Sutrupurame Kudumba Nalam
Manitha Nalamum Nattin Valamum
Manitha Nalanil Ariviyal
Manitha Nalanil Neerin Panku
Manitha Munetrathil Kalvi
Iyarkai Seetrankalum Pathukappu Vazhimuraikalam
Encyclopedia of World Tamils (Publishing editor)

Awards and achievements 

 Scientist of the Year Award by National Environmental Science Academy, New Delhi in 2008
Best Children's Science Writer Award 2015' by BAPASI in March 2015
 Best Writer's Award by Tamil Nadu Reporters Association
Prestigious Media Guild Award 2010–11
 Best Social Service Award by the Minister for Social Work for his service to the differently-abled. 
Life Time Achievement Award by The Tamil Nadu Dr.MGR Medical University.
Best Social Activist Award’ in 2017, The International Human Rights Peace Commission (Florida, USA)
Best Paper Award by Meetings International Council held at International Conference on Nanotechnology for Renewable Materials 2019, Singapore
The Best Humanitarian 2020 by ELS Edification Plus, London, UK
Honorary Fellowship Award 2020 for his outstanding contribution in the field of Chemistry by Society of Biological Sciences and Rural Development, Allahabad, U.P.

Journals 

"Synthesis and studies of carbazole based (A-D-A) polymers for organic solar cell applications" Communicated in Polymer International. E. K. T. Sivakumar, Govindasamy Sathiyan, Ramasamy Ganesamoorthy, Rangasamy Thangamuthu, Pachagoundar Sakthivel – 13 February 2016.
"Dicyanovinylene carbazole based A-D-A type small molecules for organic solar cell applications" Communicated in Synthetic Metals. E. K. T. Sivakumar, Sathiyan G, Thangamuthu R and Sakthivel P –  18 December 2015.
"Review of carbozole based conjucated molecules for highly efficient organic solar cell applications" Tetrahedron Letters, Vol (57), 2016. pp 243–252. E. K. T. Sivakumar, Sathiyan G, Ganesamoorthy R, Thangamuthu R and Sakthivel P.
"Synthesis and studies of carbazole based (A-D-A) polymers for organic solar cell applications" Published in Souvenir, "Application of Nanostructured Materials for Energy and Environmental Technology", . E. K. T. Sivakumar, Sathiyan G, Ganesamoorthy R, Thangamuthu R and Sakthivel P.
“ Synthesis of 1,7-Disubstituted N,N'-Bis (Hexyl) Perylene-3,4:9,10-Tetracarboxylic acid Diimide (PDI) small molecule for organic solar cell applications ” Published in Souvenir, "Application of Nanostructured Materials for Energy and Environmental Technology", . E. K. T. Sivakumar, Sathiyan G, Thangamuthu R and Sakthivel P.
“ Dicyanovinylenecarbazole Based A-D-A Type Low Band Gap Small Molecule for Organic Solar Cell Applications ” "Application of Nanostructured Materials for Energy and Environmental Technology" Page 321 328. . E. K. T. Sivakumar, Govindasamy Sathiyan, Ramasamy Ganesamoorthy, Pachagounder Sakthivel, Rangasamy Thangamuthu. 
“ Synthesis of N,N'-bis(2,6-diisopropylphenyl)- 1,7-di(2,2'-bithiophenyl)perylene-3,4:9,10-tetracarboxylic acid diimide (bt-pdi-ia) small molecule for organic solar cell application ” "Application of Nanostructured Materials for energy and Environmental Technology" Page 329–339. . E. K. T. Sivakumar, Ramasamy Ganesamoorthy, Govindasamy Sathiyan, Pachagounder Sakthivel, Rangasamy Thangamuthu. 
“ A Study of Electrical and Magnetic Properties of Ferrite Nano particles for Electrical Applications ” International Journal of Materials Science Vol(10), 2015 pp1 – 10. E. K. T. Sivakumar, Manimozhi, Rajendran T V, Jaisankar.
“ Synthesis and Characterization of Citric Acid based Polyester Hydroxyapetite Nanocomposites ”, Global Journal for Research Analysis, Vol.3(7), 2014, pp 20–26. E. K. T. Sivakumar, Indira R, Hariharapriya G, Jaisankar,
"Synthesis and characterization of water soluble EDTA functionalized polyesters for environmental applications", Applied chemistry Elixir Appln. Chem. 74,2014,26906-26910. By E. K. T. Sivakumar 
"Pollution of Groundwater around Saint Thomas Mount Panchayath Union Chengalpattu MGR District, Tamil Nadu, India", Journal of Industrial Pollution Control 17(2), 2001, PP 225–238. By E. K. T. Sivakumar, G.B. Sukumuran and R.K. Trivedy.
"Applications of Geochemical Modelling for the Ground water environment around Chennai city, Tamil Nadu, India", Journal of Industrial pollution control 22(1), 2006, PP 191–209. By E. K. T. Sivakumar, G.B. Sukumaran and K. Elangovan.
"Ionic conductivity of Chain Extension Supramolecular polymer material based on Reactive Hydrogen bonding motif"- Journal of Polymer and Composites 3(1), 2014, 1–7. By E. K. T. Sivakumar, V. Jaisankar and T.V.Rajendran.
" A Study on Conductivity Behaviour of Supramolecular Polymer Functionalized Magnetic Nanoparticles " (IJIRSE) International Journal of Innovative Research in Science & Engineering ISSN (2014), 2347–3207. By E. K. T. Sivakumar, T. V Rajendran, V. Jaisankar.
"Synthesis of Nano Carbon from Agro-industrial wastes" -Paper submitted (2015). By E. K. T. Sivakumar, R.Jayavel, Hannah Jebarani, Nibedita Dey and D.Angelene.
"Innovative use of Nanosilicone for scratchfree, durable and attractive coating" – Paper submitted By E. K. T. Sivakumar, R.Jayavel and J.Sandhya (2015).
"Conducting Polymeric Hydrogel Electrolyte Based on Carboxymethylcellulose and Polyacrylamide/Polyaniline for Supercapacitor Applications" N. Suganya, V. Jaisankar and E. K. T. Sivakumar

Seminars 

"Physico chemical and structural characterization of the N-Acyl chitosan Nanopowders" (2015). Third International Workshop on Advanced Functional Nanomaterials (16-18 Dec 2015). By E.K.T.Sivakumar, B. Raghavendrababu.
"Synthesis and characterization of Nickel ferrite doped polymer nanocomposites (PVA-NiFe2O4) for electrochemical device applications" (2015). Third International Workshop on Advanced Functional Nanomaterials (16-18 Dec 2015). By E.K.T.Sivakumar, R. Muthu Veerappan.
"Synthesis and characterization of aluminium doped titanium dioxide polymer nanocomposites (PVP-PEG) for solar cell applications" (2015). Third International Workshop on Advanced Functional Nanomaterials (16-18 Dec 2015). By E.K.T. Sivakumar, H. Yunussalim.
"Polyvinylchloride/MgO nanocomposites for electrical insulation application" (2015). Third International Workshop on Advanced Functional Nanomaterials (16-18 Dec 2015). By E.K.T. Sivakumar, S. Thirumalesh.
"Synthesis and characterization of fluorescence poly(carbazole-thiazolo[5,4-d]thiazole) copolymer and effect of different dopants" Third International Workshop on Advanced Functional Nanomaterials (16-18 Dec 2015). By E.K.T.Sivakumar, Govindasamy Sathiyan, Kumar Ramakrishnana, Ramasamy Ganesamoorthy Rangasamy Thangamuthu, Pachagounder Sakthivel.
"Synthesis and Characterisation of N,N'-bis(2,6-diisopropylphenyl)-1,7-di(2,2'-bithiophenyl)perylene- 3,4:9,10-tetracarboxylic acid diimide (BT-PDI-IA) Small Molecular Dye for Organic Solar Cell Application" Third International Workshop on Advanced Functional Nanomaterials (16-18 Dec 2015). By E.K.T.Sivakumar, Govindasamy Sathiyan, Kumar Ramakrishnana, Ramasamy Ganesamoorthy Rangasamy Thangamuthu, Pachagounder Sakthivel.
"Synthesis of 1,7-disubstituted N,N'-bis(hexyl) perylene-3,4:9,10-tetracarboxylic acid diimide (PDI) small molecule for organic solar cell application" International conference on Nanomaterials and Nanotechnology, Nano-15 (7-10 December 2015), Abstract page no 216 Centre For Nanoscience and Technology, K.S.Rangasamy College of Technology, Tiruchengode. By E.K.T.Sivakumar, Ramasamy Ganesamoorthy, Govindasamy S athiyan, Rangasamy Thangamuthu, Pachagoundar Sakthivel. 
"Synthesis and Studies of Carbazole Based (A-D-A) Polymers For Organic Solar Cell Applications" International conference on nanomaterials and nanotechnology, Nano-15 (7-10 December 2015), Abstract page no 216-217 Centre For Nanoscience and Technology, K.S.Rangasamy College of Technology, Tiruchengode. By E.K.T.Sivakumar, Govindasamy Sathiyan, Ramasamy Ganesamoorthy, Rangasamy Thangamuthu, Pachagoundar Sakthivel. 
"Synthesis and Characterization of Copper Oxide (CuO) Nanorods for Supercapacitor Applications" Page No. 23, DST & BRNS Sponsored National Conference-ETCM 2015, 9 &  10April 2015, Thiruvalluvar University, Vellore. By E.K.T.Sivakumar, G. Mubeen, and R. Jayavel.
"Synthesis and Characterization of ZnO- rGO Composites for the Removal of Organic Pollutants" Page No. 53, DST & BRNS Sponsored National Conference-ETCM 2015, 9 &  10April 2015, Thiruvalluvar University, Vellore. By E.K.T.Sivakumar, S. Banupriya, and R. Jayavel.
"Synthesis and Characterization of Magnetite (Fe3O4) Nanoparticles for the Study of Supercapacitor Applications" Page No. 59, DST & BRNS Sponsored National Conference-ETCM 2015, 9 &  10April 2015, Thiruvalluvar University, Vellore. By E.K.T.Sivakumar, M. V. Valar Priya, and R. Jayavel.
"Preparation and characterization of biomimitic Nano Hydroxyapatite" (2013). Second International Workshop on Advanced Functional Nanomaterials (28-30th JAN 2013). By E.K.T.Sivakumar, V. Jaisankar, R. Jayavel and V. Manimozhi.
"Optimization of Condition for Synthesis and Characterization of Nano Carbons from Agro Industrial Wastes" (2013) – National Seminar on Recent Trends in Nanobiotechnology – Association of Nanoscience and Nanotechnology Aspirants(ANNA). 07-08 MAR 2011.  By E.K.T.Sivakumar, D.Angelene, Hanna Jebarani and Nibedita Dey.
"Hydration Studies on Nanoclay incorporated Complex Composites" (2013)- International Conference on Engineering Materials and process (ICEMAP-2013) -Tagore Engineering College, Chennai. 23rd and 24th MAY 2013. By E.K.T.Sivakumar, Madhuree Dharpure, Bhuvanesvari and B, Nagesh R.Iyer.
"Application of Iron Nanoparticles in Waste Water Treatment" (2011)- NanoMeet 2011 – A Technical Symposium on Materials of Applied Nanoscience and Nanotechnology Research (MANNAR). By E.K.T.Sivakumar, R. Jayavel and V. Jaisankar.
"Innovative use of Nanotechnology and ultrasonic waves in paint" Indigenous nanomaterials development for industrial applications(INDIA),27-28Th 2012 Centre for Nano Science and Technology, Anna University, Chennai. By E.K.T.Sivakumar and R. Mexalin Mero.
"Application of Iron Nanoparticles in Waste Water Treatment" (2011)- NanoMeet 2011 – A Technical Symposium on Materials of Applied Nanoscience and Nanotechnology Research (MANNAR). By E.K.T.Sivakumar, R. Jayavel and V. Jaisankar.
"Conceptual Geochemical Modelling of Groundwater" (2001)- National Symposium onMetallo – Organic chelates and recent advances in Chemistry. Research &P.G.Dept of Chemistry, Presidency College, Chennai 9& 10 Feb 2001 P (IP-10). By E.K.T. Sivakumar, V. Balasubramanian and G.B. Sukumaran.
"Groundwater Characterization of a part of the Chennai city, Tamil Nadu" (2000) – Proceedings of the State Conference on Groundwater Exploration Techniques, National College,Tiruchi-1, 30– 31March 2000, PP:11-16. By E.K.T. Sivakumar, C.G. Chandrasekaran, B. Gowthaman and G.B. Sukumuran.
"Study of Groundwater Quality Around Ambattur and Anna Nagar, Tiruvallur and Chennai District, TamilNadu" (2000) – XIIth Indian Geological Congress and National Seminar on Groundwater Resources. 8th-12th Feb2000. Udaipur-313002. PP:129-130. By E.K.T. Sivakumar, C.G. Chandrasekaran and G.B. Sukumuran.
"Comparative Geo-Physical Data Study of Different Geological formations, Kancheepuram&Tiruvallur Districts, Tamilndadu" (2000) – XIIth Indian Geological Congress and National Seminar on Groundwater Resources. 8-12 Feb.2000. Udaipur-313002. By E.K.T.Sivakumar, G.B. Sukumuran and P. Neelameham.
"Quality of Groundwater and its improvement Around part of Chennai City – Tamilnadu" (2000)-XIIth Indian Geological Congress and National Seminar on Groundwater Resources.8-12 Feb.2000. PP.130–132. By E.K.T.Sivakumar, G.B. Sukumuran and C.G. Chandrasekaran.
"Hydrogeochemistry of River Cooum – Tamil Nadu South India." (1998)- International Seminar on Applied Hydrogeochemistry, Annamalai University, Chidambaram, India, Nov.1998, proc.vol. PP:238-249. By E.K.T. Sivakumar, and G.B. Sukumuran.
"Tannery Effluent and Garbage Pollution of Groundwater Around Saint Thomas Mount Panchayath Union, Chengalpattu MGR Dt. TamilNadu" (1997)- National Symposium on Sustainable Groundwater Development and Management and The Annual Convention of Geological Society of India. Nov.5th – 8th 1997, PP:46. By E.K.T.Sivakumar, G.B. Sukumaran and G. Bharathidasan.

References

Further reading 

 Advances in Heterocyclic Chemistry
 Nanomaterials for Green Energy

External links 

http://ektsiva.in/
http://www.esro.in/
https://www.thehindu.com/features/education/professor-gets-lifetime-achievement-award/article3639355.ece

1968 births
Living people
20th-century Indian chemists